Lesley Lewis is an Australian writer, researcher and script editor who has worked extensively in television.

Select filmography
A Country Practice
Water Rats – researcher, script editor
Murder Call – trainee script editor, script editor
All Saints – script editor
McLeod's Daughters – associate script producer
Out of the Blue (2008) – associate script producer
Cops LAC – writer
Home and Away – associate story producer
Neighbours (2011 – 2014) – writer, associate story producer, story producer
Wonderland - associate story producer

External links

Lesley Lewis at National Film and Sound Archive
Lesley Lewis at AustLit

Living people
Australian writers
Year of birth missing (living people)